Burak Değer Biçer (born March 16, 1977) is a Turkish Brazilian Jiu-Jitsu practitioner and competitor. He holds a black belt under Ricardo Vieira and currently represents ADCC in Turkey.

References

External links
Official Web Site
Corvos Website
International Brazilian Jiu-Jitsu Federation
ADCC Submission Wrestling World Championship

Turkish practitioners of Brazilian jiu-jitsu
1977 births
Living people